Mohammad Nasseri is an Iranian Football goalkeeper who currently plays for Iranian football club Aluminium Arak in the Persian Gulf Pro League.

Club career
Nasseri started his career with Payam Academy. In 2008, he joined Sepahan Academy and after a season with U21 side, he promoted to first team. In Summer 2013 he joined Gostaresh Foulad on loan until end of season. At the end of 2013–14 season, he signed permanently with Gostaresh Foulad. Nasseri joined to Siah Jamegan in summer 2015. He made his professional debut for Siah Jamegan on January 29, 2016 in 2-1 win against Naft Tehran as a starter.

Club career statistics

References

External links
 Mohammad Nasseri at IranLeague.ir

1993 births
Living people
Iranian footballers
Sepahan S.C. footballers
Gostaresh Foulad F.C. players
Siah Jamegan players
Footballers at the 2014 Asian Games
Association football goalkeepers
Asian Games competitors for Iran